George Frederick William de Relwyskow (18 June 1887 – 1942) was an English sport wrestler who competed in the 1908 Summer Olympics for Great Britain.

Biography

Born in Kensington in 1887, the son of immigrants from the Russian Empire, de Relwyskow took up wrestling as a means of keeping fit while a student in London training as an artist and designer. By 1907 he had won thirty-five open competitions in Great Britain and won the English amateur  championships at lightweight and middleweight in 1907 and 1908. Because of his success he selected to represent Great Britain in the 1908 Olympics held in London.

On the outbreak of the First World War de Relwyskow returned to Britain from South America where he was on a wrestling tour to enlist in the Army. He served as a gymnastic and bayonet-fighting trainer, and served for a period with the  Australian infantry. In France he trained soldiers in the use of unarmed combat. In October 1918 de Relwyskow was based at Aldershot as a Royal Army Physical Training Corps instructor in the Army system of wrestling, a system he created. In 1924 he was appointed trainer to the British Olympic Games team in the 1924 Olympics held in Paris.

He enlisted again at the start of World War II and served as an instructor in Unarmed Combat and Silent Killing with the Special Operations Executive (SOE). After serving for a period as an Instructor to the SOE School in Canada - the Special Training School (STS) 103 (which was also known as "Camp X"), de Relwyskow returned to Britain before being sent to the Far East.

Relwyskow died at his Leeds home in 1942. He left a wife, Clara, and sons Douglas and George. Douglas was a professional wrestling referee, whose own son, also called Douglas (grandson of the original George), became a regular face on televised professional wrestling in the UK under the name Barry Douglas (and briefly as the masked Battle Star). The younger George de Relwyskow pursued a career in professional wrestling  cut short by an injury in  World War II.  He later became a successful wrestling promoter and member of Joint Promotions and the promotional business was continued after his death in 1980 by his daughter Ann.  Unlike other Joint members, Ann Relwyskow did not sell her share on to Max Crabtree but remained independent as part of Joint until her retirement in 1994, contributing her own matches to ITV's coverage as well as two later TV tapings broadcast regionally on STV and Grampian TV in 1989 and 1991.

George de Relwyskow was the youngest winner of an Olympic gold medal for wrestling, a record that was to stand for almost seventy years until the 20-year-old Soviet Suren Nalbandyan won the Greco-Roman lightweight title in 1976.

Publications
 The Art of Wrestling Gale & Polden, London (1919)
 My Simple Way to Health (1924)
 The Art of Wrestling Naval and Military Press, (2017)

References

External links
George de Relwyskow on the Database Olympics website

Detailed biography om CBQ Services website

1887 births
1943 deaths
Military personnel from London
Sportspeople from Kensington
English people of Belarusian descent
Olympic wrestlers of Great Britain
Wrestlers at the 1908 Summer Olympics
British male sport wrestlers
Medalists at the 1908 Summer Olympics
English Olympic medallists
Olympic gold medallists for Great Britain
Olympic silver medallists for Great Britain
Olympic medalists in wrestling
Australian military personnel of World War I
Royal Army Physical Training Corps soldiers
British Army personnel of World War II
British Special Operations Executive personnel
People associated with physical culture
British Army personnel of World War I